Takalo is a Niuean war dance. Performed by an individual warrior or group of warriors, the dance is a formal challenge. The dance was traditionally performed prior to engaging the enemy with traditional war clubs.  

In modern times, the takalo is often performed prior to a rugby game or winning a game of some sport code.  The takalo is also performed to welcome dignitaries after they land in Niue, persons of high status like prime ministers, presidents and governors general – it signifies that the dignitaries' arrival is for the purpose of peace and harmony.

See also
 Haka

References

Niuean culture
War dances
Dances of Polynesia